= Puralal =

Coordinates: 25°37′N 82°14′E

Puralal is a village in Garwara, Uttar Pradesh, India.
